J.C. is a 1972 American action film directed by William F. McGaha and written by William F. McGaha and Joe Thirty. The film stars William F. McGaha, Hannibal Penney, Joanna Moore, Burr DeBenning, Slim Pickens and Pat Delaney. The film was released on April 1, 1972, by AVCO Embassy Pictures.

Plot

Cast     
William F. McGaha as J.C. Masters 
Hannibal Penney as David Little
Joanna Moore as Miriam Wages
Burr DeBenning as Dan Martin
Slim Pickens as Grady Caldwell
Pat Delaney as Kim McKool 
Judy Frazier as Rachel Myers 
Max Payne as Mr. Clean
Conrad Peavey as Hunter 
Matthew Gart as Carlton Wages
Brenda Sutton as Neffie
Carol Hall as Shirley 'The Saint'
Byron Warner as Disciple
Bob Corley as D.J. Nabors
Bud Allen as Beaver
Simone Griffith as Harriet 'The Hare'
Bill Chapman as Foreman
Beverly Littles as Panama Red
Gracia Deen as M Y Bird
Mike Vann as Ben Wages
Steve Brown as Charles
Howard Lynch as Von Wheelie

References

External links
 

1972 films
American action films
1972 action films
Embassy Pictures films
1970s English-language films
1970s American films
English-language action films